Water chickweed is a common name for several plants and may refer to:

Montia fontana
Stellaria aquatica